Phathana Phommathep is a Laotian footballer who plays as a midfielder for Ezra F.C. and the Laos national football team. Besides Laos, he has played in Thailand.

Early life

Born in a small village called Oudomvilay located in Savannakhet Province, he started playing football at an early age as his uncle was a coach of the local side. Aged eight, Phathana joined his first team and made his way to the incipient Korean-backed Ezra F.C. During his time here, he attracted the interest from Lanexang United who saw him as a footballer they could build their squad around.

Career

Club
Making one appearance in the Mekong Cup against Buriram United of Thailand in 2016, his club viewed him as a regular starter in the 2017 season and his coach Leonardo Vitorino praised him as 'the most talented player he had seen in Lao football'. However, his progress as a player would be hampered by the disbandment of his club Lanexang United. In June 2017, he signed for Kalasin F.C. of Thailand. In 2017, he signed for Chonburi.

International

For the 2016 AFC U-19 Championship qualifiers, he was the number 25 midfielder.

On June 7, 2017, the Savannakhet native made his senior team debut in a  4-0 loss to the UAE.

International goals
Scores and results list Laos' goal tally first.

References

1999 births
Living people
Laotian footballers
Association football midfielders
Laos international footballers
Lanexang United F.C. players
Laotian expatriate footballers
Laotian expatriate sportspeople in Thailand
Expatriate footballers in Thailand
People from Savannakhet province
Competitors at the 2017 Southeast Asian Games
Phathana Phommathep
Competitors at the 2021 Southeast Asian Games
Southeast Asian Games competitors for Laos